Le Commandant Charcot is an icebreaking cruise ship operated by the French shipping company Compagnie du Ponant. Named after the French polar scientist Jean-Baptiste Charcot, the vessel was built at Vard Tulcea shipyard in Romania, from where she was moved to Søviknes for final outfitting and delivery in 2021.

Description 

Le Commandant Charcot is a Polar Class 2 rated icebreaking vessel capable of reaching remote polar destinations such as the Geographic North Pole. She features a hybrid power plant powered by liquefied natural gas (LNG) and 5 MWh electric batteries, capable of briefly driving the ship without engines running.

Design and construction 

The ship was launched in March 2020 and left the yard in Romania on 29 March, heading for Norway. She arrived at VARD shipyard in Søvik, Haram, Norway on 28 April 2020. In June 2021, she was in the Arctic for the first time during sea trials.

Career 

After delivery on 29 July 2021, Le Commandant Charcot sailed from mainland Norway to Svalbard and from there to the Geographic North Pole, where she arrived on 6 September 2021.

In December 2021, the ship went on a 16-day exploration cruise from Ushuaia, Argentina to the Weddell Sea and Antarctic Peninsula, allowing passengers to experience a total solar eclipse from the Weddell Sea ice pack.

In February 2022, Le Commandant Charcot collaborated with the British Antarctic Survey research vessel RRS Sir David Attenborough in Antarctica. The cruise ship, capable of breaking much thicker ice, created a channel for the research vessel in second-year ice covered with thick layer of snow in Stange Sound.

In late July 2022, Le Commandant Charcot accompanied the Norwegian polar research vessel Kronprins Haakon to the North Pole.

References

External links 
 Official website

Ships of Compagnie du Ponant
Icebreakers of France
2020 ships